The 1987 FIBA European Champions Cup Final was the deciding game of the 1986–87 FIBA European Champions Cup season. The game was played on 2 April 1987, at the Centre Intercommunal de Glace de Malley, in Lausanne, Switzerland.

Match details

Awards

FIBA European Champions Cup Finals Top Scorer
 Lee Johnson ( Maccabi Tel Aviv)

External links
FIBA European League 1986–87

1986–87 in European basketball
1988–89
1987 in Swiss sport
1986–87 in Italian basketball
1986–87 in Israeli basketball
International basketball competitions hosted by Switzerland